Sanjay (Xonzoi) Barbora is a professor at the Tata Institute of Social Sciences Guwahati and the former Dean of School of Social Sciences. He is on the editorial board of Refugee Watch. He is also on the board of trustees of The Kohima Institute.

Studies and early life 
Barbora completed his BA in Sociology from Elphinstone College under Mumbai University. He then received his MA and MPhil from the Department of Sociology at Delhi School of Economics. His MPhil thesis title was Plantation Systems and Labour Movements in Assam, 1826-1947. He was awarded PhD from North-Eastern Hill University in 2007.

He worked as the regional programme manager for Panos South Asia. He helped start the North Eastern Social Research Centre, Guwahati while working as an Honorary Senior Fellow.

Writings

Journal articles 

 “National Register of Citizens: Politics and Problems in Assam” in Explorations, 3 (2). Pp 3-28. (October 2019).
 "The Crises of Citizenship in Assam" in The India Forum, (Published online on 8 March 2019).
 "Riding the Rhino: Conservation, Conflicts and Militarisation of Kaziranga National Park in Assam", in Antipode: A Radical Journal of Geography, 49 (5). Pp 1145-1163.
 "Remaking Dibrugarh in Contemporary Assam" in The Newsletter Summer Issue (77), 2017. Pp. 40.
 "Remember Easter of 1916? When the Irish Declared a Republic" in Economic and Political Weekly, 51 (25), 16 June 2016. Pp. 25-28.
 (With Erik de Maaker and Dolly Kikon) ""Shifting Ground? State and market in the uplands of Northeast India" in The Newsletter, International Institute for Asian Studies (73), Spring 2016. Pp. 6-7.
 "Uneasy Homecomings: Political Entanglements in Contemporary Assam" in South Asia: journal of South Asian Studies, 38 (2), 290-309 (2015).
 "After counter-insurgency: policing dissent in Assam" in Seminar, 640 (Assam: Unstable Peace), December 2012. Pp. 63-67.
 "Life After Empires: Comparing Trajectories of Workers in Plantations (Assam) and Kolkhozes (Kyrgyzstan)", in Refugee Watch: A South Asian Journal on Forced Migration, (38), (December 2011); pp. 32-46. 
 "Assam’s New Voice of Dissent", in Economic and Political Weekly, (July 9, 2011), 46(28). Pp. 19-22.
 (With Susan Thieme, Karin A. Siegmann, Vineeta Menon and Ganesh Gurung). 2008. "Migration matters in South Asia: Commonalities and critiques" in Economic and Political Weekly 43(24):57-65.
 "Autonomous Councils And/Or Ethnic Homelands: An Ethnographic Account of the Genesis of Political Violence in Assam (Northeast India) Against the Normative Frame of the Indian Constitution" in International Journal on Minority and Group Rights 15 (2-3). 2008. Pp. 313-334.  
 "Rethinking India’s Counter-insurgency Campaign in North-East", in Economic and Political Weekly, XLI (35); pp. 3805-3812 (September 2006). 
 "Labouring Conflicts in Karbi Anglong", in Labour File 2 (3). New Delhi: May–June, 2004. 21-24.
 "Ethnic politics and land use: Genesis of conflicts in India’s North-East", in Economic and Political Weekly, 37 (13), 30 March 2002. Pp. 1285-1292.
 "Planter Raj to Police Raj", in Revolutionary Democracy, 5(2), September 2000.
 "Struggles in the Tea Plantations of Assam: Then and Now", in Revolutionary Democracy, 5 (1), April 1999.

Book chapters 

 "Violence, Agrarian Change and the Politics of Autonomy in Assam" in  B. Karlsson, M. Vandenhelsken and M. Barkataki-Ruscheweyh (Eds), Geographies of Difference: Identity, Society and Landscapes in Northeast India, London: Routledge (2017). Pp. 128-149.
 "Unearthing a Terrible Beauty: Violence and the Politics of Choices in Assam" in K. Kannabiran (Ed), Violence and its Habitations in South Asia, New Delhi: Oxford University Press (2016). Pp. 276-294.
 (With Saba Sharma) "Survivors of Ethnic Conflict" in Harsh Mander (Ed), India Exclusion Report, New Delhi: Yoda Press (2016). 
 "Weary of Wars: Memory, Violence and Women in the Making of Contemporary Assam" in Uma Chakravarti (Ed), Sexual violence and impunity, Vol. 1, New Delhi: Zubaan Publishers (2016).
 "Seven Sisters" in Gita Dharampal-Frick, Monica Kirloskar-Steinbach, Rachel Dwyer and Jahnavi Phalkey (Eds), Key Concepts in Modern Indian Studies, New Delhi: Oxford University Press (2015).
 "Road to Resentment: Impunity and its impact on notions of community in Assam" in Patrick Hoenig and Navsharan Singh (Ed). Understanding Impunity in South Asia, New Delhi: Zubaan (2014). Pp. 110-127.
 "Media and Minorities in the United Kingdom" in Subir Bhaumik (Ed). Counter-Gaze: Media, Migrants, Minorities, Frontpage: London and Kolkata. Pp. 66-75. (2010).
 "Autonomy in India’s Northeast: The Frontiers of Centralised Politics" in Thomas Benedikter (Ed). Solving Ethnic Conflicts Through Self-governance, Bolzano/Bolzen: Eurasia-Net. Pp. 80-85. (2009)
 "Natural Resources Contested in Autonomous Councils: Assessing the Causes of Ethnic Conflict in North-East India" in Urs Geiser and Stephan Rist (Ed). Decentralisation Meets Local Complexity:Local Struggles, State Decentralisation and Access to Natural Resources in South Asia and Latin America, Bern: National Centre of Competence in Research (North-South). Pp. 191-210. (2009)
 (With Walter Fernandes) "Development, Displacement and the Right to Life" in Samir Kumar Das (Ed). Blisters on their feet: Tales of Internally Displaced Persons in India's North-East, New Delhi: Sage Publication. Pp 314-336. (2008).
 "Autonomy in the Northeast: The Frontiers of Centralised Politics", in Ranabir Samaddar (Ed), The Politics of Autonomy: Indian Experiences, New Delhi: Sage Publications. 2005.
 "Peace Process in Assam: Some Considerations", in Imdad Hussain (Ed), The Guwahati Declaration and the Road to Peace in Assam, New Delhi: Akansha Publications. 2005.

Documentary movies 

 (With Kazimuddin Ahmed) 2008-9. Football Reconciliation (20 minute documentary on the reconciliation process between different Naga armed groups in Northeast India). Panos South Asia documentary. The documentary has been screened in Zurich, New Delhi, Kohima, Dimapur, Guwahati and has now been handed over to the Forum for Naga Reconciliation (FNR) for distribution and dissemination. 
 (With Susan Thieme). 2008. The other Silk Road (28 min documentary on labour migration in post-Soviet Central Asia, especially Kyrgyzstan and Kazakhstan). NCCR North-South and PANOS South Asia. (The film was screened in Kathmandu, Kohima, Stanford University, Berkeley, New York, Bern, Zurich and Bishkek).

Radio 

 Co-hosted and produced with Preeti Mangalasekhar for KPFA, Berkeley: APEX Express show (2011).
 Interview with Mr. Kyaw Zwa Moe (Managing Editor of Irrawady News, Chiangmai, Thailand) on the fallout of Burma's elections of 7 November 2010.
 Interview with Dr. Bishnu Raj Upreti, (South Asia regional coordinator for National Centre for Competence and Research, north–south) and Ms. Anita Bhattarai-Ghimire, (research scholar, Kathmandu University) on the state of internally displaced persons in Nepal, January 2010.
 Interview with Mr. Nurul Kabir (editor, New Age, Bangladesh) on the political situation in Bangladesh, October 2008.
 Interview with Dr. Walter Fernandes (director, North Eastern Social Research Centre, Guwahati), Mr. C.R. Bijoy and Mr. Shankar Gopalakrishnan (Campaign for Survival and Dignity) on the impact and implications of Forest Dwellers’ Act, 2006 passed by the Government of India, January 2008.

References

Indian sociologists
People from Jorhat district
North-Eastern Hill University alumni
Delhi School of Economics alumni
Elphinstone College alumni
Tata Institute of Social Sciences
Living people
Year of birth missing (living people)